Vasadze may refer to:

Mamuka Vasadze, former acting Chief Prosecutor of Georgia (2018)
Tariel Vasadze (born 1947), Ukrainian businessman
29122 Vasadze, a main-belt asteroid

See also
Vashadze, a Georgian surname